Khaleda Panna is a Bangladesh Nationalist Party politician and the former Member of Parliament from a reserved seat.

Career
Panna was elected to parliament from reserved seat as a Bangladesh Nationalist Party candidate in 2005.

References

Living people
Bangladesh Nationalist Party politicians
Women members of the Jatiya Sangsad
8th Jatiya Sangsad members
Year of birth missing (living people)
21st-century Bangladeshi women politicians
21st-century Bangladeshi politicians
20th-century Bangladeshi women politicians